The Lengue language, also called Molengue, Balengue, Molendji, is a Bantu language of southern Equatorial Guinea, spoken by the Lengue people between Bata and the Gabon border near the coast. The speakers have come under increasing Fang influence. The Ethnologue describes it as a member of the B subgroup of Northwest Bantu, while Echegaray is more specific, saying that it is linguistically a member of the Sheke group (B21 of Guthrie's Bantu subclassification):
 "The Balengues – linguistically at least – are related to the Sheke group in general, and especially to Itemus and Nvikos." (p. 51)

Echegaray lists their main settlements as being located south of Bata between Punta Nguba and the Benito River, as well as three before the Ndote River, and a few further south or inland.

References

 Carlos González Echegaray.  Estudios Guineos: Vol. II. Madrid: Consejo Superior de Investigaciones Cientificas 1959.
 Igor Cusack. "Hispanic and Bantu Inheritance, Trauma, Dispersal and Return: Some Contributions to a Sense of National Identity in Equatorial Guinea". Nations and Nationalism, Volume 5 Issue 2 Page 207  - April 1999.
 Quilis, Antonio y Celia Casado-Fresnillo. 1995. La lengua española en Guinea Ecuatorial. Madrid: Universidad Nacional de Educación a Distancia.

External links
 Equatorial Guinea: Culture and Environment

 
Kele languages
Languages of Equatorial Guinea